The Williamson County Courthouse in Franklin, Tennessee is a historic courthouse.  It is a contributing building in the Franklin Historic District, listed on the National Register of Historic Places.

The courthouse was built in 1858 and is the third one to serve the county. Its portico has four Doric columns which were cast at a nearby foundry.

It was damaged in an 1871 tornado but was restored.

In 1888, a 23-year-old African-American suspect, Amos Miller, was lynched: hanged from the balcony of the courthouse after being taken by a mob from the courtroom before his trial was completed.

On the grounds of the courthouse is a Confederate Monument, which is separately listed on the National Register. A statue, March to Freedom was also installed outside.

See also
 Lynching of Amos Miller

References

Courthouses on the National Register of Historic Places in Tennessee
National Register of Historic Places in Williamson County, Tennessee
Greek Revival architecture in Tennessee
County courthouses in Tennessee
1858 establishments in Tennessee